Jason F. Esteves is an American attorney and politician serving as a member of the Georgia State Senate for the 6th district. Elected in November 2022, he assumed office on January 9, 2023.

Education 
Esteves earned a Bachelor of Arts degree in psychology from the University of Miami and a Juris Doctor from the Emory University School of Law.

Career 
From 2005 to 2007, Esteves was a member of Teach For America. He worked as an associate at McKenna Long & Aldridge in Atlanta from 2010 to 2014. From 2014 to 2022, he served as a member of the Atlanta Board of Education. Esteves joined Equifax as assistant general counsel in 2014 and became a vice president in 2019. He was elected to the Georgia State Senate in November 2022.

References 

Living people
Georgia (U.S. state) Democrats
Georgia (U.S. state) state senators
University of Miami alumni
Emory University School of Law alumni
Georgia (U.S. state) lawyers
Politicians from Atlanta
Year of birth missing (living people)